Tuvalu, previously known as the Ellice Islands, is an island country in Polynesia in the Pacific Ocean. The soil is very weakly developed, consisting mostly of coral sand and calcium carbonate-rich regosols. Vegetation on the islands predominantly consists of coconuts, screw palms, Casuarina, creepers, and grass, although some native forest exists. Previously, the islands were likely covered with Pisonia woodland.

Thirty-seven species of birds have been recorded on Tuvalu, one of which has been introduced by humans. Thirteen of these species, nine of which are seabirds, breed in the country. The Pacific reef-heron, Pacific imperial-pigeon, and buff-banded rail, along with the introduced red junglefowl, are the remaining breeding species. Nine species of shorebird, eight species of seabird, mallards, and long-railed koels are migratory visitors to the islands. Four species of birds found in Tuvalu are globally threatened; the bristle-thighed curlew, bar-tailed godwit, and gray-tailed tattler are near-threatened, while the Phoenix petrel is endangered. Before the arrival of humans, the birds of the islands may have also included kingfishers, Acrocephalus warblers, Aplonis starlings, Prosobonia sandpipers, and fruit doves. However, higher sea levels at that time might have eliminated fresh water sources on most of the atolls, making them unsuitable for pigeons or starlings.

This list's taxonomic treatment (designation and sequence of orders, families,  and species) and nomenclature (common and scientific names) follow the conventions of the 2022 edition of The Clements Checklist of Birds of the World. The family accounts at the beginning of each heading reflect this taxonomy, as do the species counts found in each family account.

The following codes have been used to show several categories. Species without any tags are commonly occurring native species.

 (A) Accidental: a species that rarely or accidentally occurs in Tuvalu.
 (I) Introduced: a species introduced to Tuvalu as a direct or indirect consequence of human action.

Ducks, geese, and waterfowl

Order: AnseriformesFamily: Anatidae

Anatidae includes the ducks and most duck-like waterfowl, such as geese and swans. These birds are adapted to an aquatic existence with webbed feet, flattened bills, and feathers that are excellent at shedding water due to an oily coating.

Pacific black duck, Anas superciliosa 
Mallard, Anas platyrhynchos (A)

Pheasants, grouse, and allies
Order: GalliformesFamily: Phasianidae

The Phasianidae are a family of terrestrial birds which consists of quails, partridges, snowcocks, francolins, spurfowls, tragopans, monals, pheasants, peafowls and jungle fowls. In general, they are plump (although they vary in size) and have broad, relatively short wings.

Red junglefowl, Gallus gallus (I)

Pigeons and doves

Order: ColumbiformesFamily: Columbidae

Pigeons and doves are stout-bodied birds with short necks and short slender bills with a fleshy cere.

Pacific imperial-pigeon, Ducula pacifica

Cuckoos
Order: CuculiformesFamily: Cuculidae

The family Cuculidae includes cuckoos, roadrunners, and anis. These birds are of variable size with slender bodies, long tails, and strong legs.

Long-tailed koel, Urodynamis taitensis

Rails, gallinules, and coots

Order: GruiformesFamily: Rallidae

Rallidae is a large family of small to medium-sized birds which includes the rails, crakes, coots, and gallinules. Typically they inhabit dense vegetation in damp environments near lakes, swamps, or rivers. In general, they are shy and secretive birds, making them difficult to observe. Most species have strong legs and long toes which are well adapted to soft uneven surfaces. They tend to have short, rounded wings and to be weak fliers. The buff-banded rail only established a breeding population in 1972.

Buff-banded rail, Gallirallus philippensis

Plovers and lapwings
Order: CharadriiformesFamily: Charadriidae

The family Charadriidae includes the plovers, dotterels, and lapwings. They are small to medium-sized birds with compact bodies, short, thick necks, and long, usually pointed, wings. They are found in the open country worldwide.

Pacific golden-plover, Pluvialis fulva
Common ringed plover, Charadrius hiaticula (A)
Semipalmated plover, Charadrius semipalmatus (A)

Sandpipers and allies

Order: CharadriiformesFamily: Scolopacidae

Scolopacidae is a large diverse family of small to medium-sized shorebirds including the sandpipers, curlews, godwits, shanks, tattlers, woodcocks, snipes, dowitchers and phalaropes. The majority of these species eat small invertebrates picked out of the mud or soil. Some species have highly specialised bills adapted to specific feeding strategies.

Bristle-thighed curlew, Numenius tahitiensis
Whimbrel, Numenius phaeopus (A)
Bar-tailed godwit, Limosa lapponica
Ruddy turnstone, Arenaria interpres
Sanderling, Calidris alba 
Gray-tailed tattler, Tringa brevipes 
Wandering tattler, Tringa incana

Gulls, terns, and skimmers

Order: CharadriiformesFamily: Laridae

Laridae is a family of medium to large seabirds, the gulls, terns, and skimmers. Gulls are typically grey or white, often with black markings on the head or wings. They have stout, longish bills and webbed feet. Terns are a group of generally medium to large seabirds typically with grey or white plumage, often with black markings on the head. Most terns hunt fish by diving, but some pick insects off the surface of fresh water.

Brown noddy, Anous stolidus
Black noddy, Anous minutus
Blue-gray noddy, Anous ceruleus (A)
White tern, Gygis alba
Sooty tern, Onychoprion fuscatus
Grey-backed tern, Onychoprion lunatus (A)
Bridled tern, Onychoprion anaethetus
Black-naped tern, Sterna sumatrana
Great crested tern, Thalasseus bergii

Tropicbirds

Order: PhaethontiformesFamily: Phaethontidae

Tropicbirds are slender white birds of tropical oceans, with exceptionally long central tail feathers. Their heads and long wings have black markings.

White-tailed tropicbird, Phaethon lepturus
Red-tailed tropicbird, Phaethon rubricauda (A)

Shearwaters and petrels
Order: ProcellariiformesFamily: Procellariidae

The procellariids are the main group of medium-sized "true petrels", characterised by united nostrils with a medium nasal septum and a long outer functional primary flight feather.

Phoenix petrel, Pterodroma alba (A)
Wedge-tailed shearwater, Ardenna pacificus (A)
Christmas shearwater, Puffinus nativitatis (A)
Tropical shearwater, Puffinus bailloni (A)

Frigatebirds

Order: SuliformesFamily: Fregatidae

Frigatebirds are large seabirds usually found over tropical oceans. They are large, black and white, or completely black, with long wings and deeply forked tails. The males have colored inflatable throat pouches. They do not swim or walk and cannot take off from a flat surface. They are essentially aerial, able to stay aloft for days at a time.

Lesser frigatebird, Fregata ariel
Great frigatebird, Fregata minor

Boobies and gannets

Order: SuliformesFamily: Sulidae

The sulids comprise the gannets and boobies. Both groups are medium to large coastal seabirds that plunge-dive for fish.

Masked booby, Sula dactylatra (A)
Brown booby, Sula leucogaster
Red-footed booby, Sula sula

Herons, egrets, and bitterns
Order: PelecaniformesFamily: Ardeidae

The family Ardeidae contains the bitterns, herons, and egrets. Herons and egrets are medium to large wading birds with long necks and legs. Bitterns tend to be shorter-necked and warier. Members of Ardeidae fly with their necks retracted.

Pacific reef-heron, Egretta sacra

See also
List of birds
Lists of birds by region
Funafuti Conservation Area

References

Specific

General 
 
 

Tuvalu
birds
'
'